Michaël Madionis Mateo Maria (born 31 January 1995) is a Curaçaoan professional footballer who plays as a left-back or defensive midfielder for the Curaçao national team.

Club career

Adelaide United
In July 2019, Maria was purchased by Adelaide United and signed a two-year contract. Maria made his debut for 'The Reds' in the FFA Cup Round of 32 playing as a winger defeating the Melbourne Knights 5–2. He mutually departed from United on 18 June 2020.

NAC Breda
On 28 January 2021, Maria signed a 2.5-year contract with NAC Breda.

International career
Michaël Maria has played for Curaçao at the U-20 level. He played his first full international match for Curaçao at the 2018 FIFA World Cup qualification match against Montserrat on 27 March 2015. He was substituted on in the 65th minute for Papito Merencia.

Career statistics

Club

International

Honours
Adelaide United
 FFA Cup: 2019

Curaçao
 Caribbean Cup: 2017
 King's Cup: 2019

References

External links
 
 

Living people
1995 births
Sportspeople from Kerkrade
Association football midfielders
Curaçao footballers
Curaçao international footballers
Dutch footballers
Footballers from Limburg (Netherlands)
Dutch people of Curaçao descent
VfL Bochum II players
VfL Bochum players
SG Sonnenhof Großaspach players
FC Erzgebirge Aue players
FC Twente players
Jong FC Twente players
Charlotte Independence players
Adelaide United FC players
NAC Breda players
2. Bundesliga players
3. Liga players
USL Championship players
Eredivisie players
Eerste Divisie players
2017 CONCACAF Gold Cup players
2019 CONCACAF Gold Cup players
Curaçao expatriate footballers
Curaçao expatriate sportspeople in Germany
Dutch expatriate footballers
Dutch expatriate sportspeople in Germany
Expatriate footballers in Germany
Curaçao expatriate sportspeople in the United States
Dutch expatriate sportspeople in the United States
Expatriate soccer players in the United States
Dutch expatriate sportspeople in Australia
Curaçao expatriate sportspeople in Australia
Expatriate soccer players in Australia